Oorderen was a small Belgian village near the city of Antwerp until 1965. It was demolished because of the extension of the Port of Antwerp.

The village was first mentioned in 1116 and merged into the city of Antwerp in 1927.

In its place came Plant 2 of General Motors, later Opel Antwerp, now defunct.

Another part of the village was taken by the railroad yard Antwerp-North and railway station Antwerp-Harbour.

Other villages that were taken by the harbor of Antwerp are Wilmarsdonk,  and

External links 

 A century in pictures—1965 (in Dutch)

History of Antwerp
Former municipalities of Antwerp Province
Former populated places in Belgium